Darreh Cheh (also Romanized as Darreh Chāh) is a village in Zaz-e Sharqi Rural District, Zaz va Mahru District, Aligudarz County, Lorestan Province, Iran. At the 2006 census, its population was 111, with 16 families.

References 

Towns and villages in Aligudarz County